Hypatopa eos is a moth in the family Blastobasidae. It is found in Costa Rica.

The length of the forewings is about 3.3 mm. The forewings are pale brown intermixed with yellowish-brown and brown scales. The hindwings are translucent pale brown.

Etymology
The specific name refers to Eos, one of the horses of the Sun.

References

Moths described in 2013
Hypatopa